Ricardo Garcia may refer to:
Ricardo García (attorney), Public Defender for Los Angeles County
Ricardo García (footballer) (1955–2007), Costa Rican footballer
Ricardo Garcia (musician), Spanish flamenco guitarist
Ricardo Garcia (volleyball) (born 1975), Brazilian volleyball player
Ricardo García (pentathlete), Mexican modern pentathlete
Ricardo García (cyclist, born 1926), Mexican cyclist
Ricardo García (cyclist, born 1988), Spanish cyclist
Ricardo García Mercet (1860–1933), Spanish naturalist and entomologist
Ricardo Garcia (German musician), also known as Ricky Garcia, guitarist who played in the band LaFee

See also
Ricardo García Posada Airport, an airport in Chile